Look At Me (2001) is a novel by American writer  Jennifer Egan. It was a National Book Award Finalist. The novel was described in The New Yorker as "an energetic, unorthodox, quintessentially American vision of America,"  and in Kirkus Reviews as "a surprisingly satisfying stew of philosophy, social commentary, and storytelling."

References 

2001 American novels
Nan A. Talese books